Turkish Red Crescent (Turkish: Türk Kızılay (official) or Kızılay (for short) is the largest humanitarian organization in Turkey and is part of the International Red Cross and Red Crescent Movement.

The organization was founded in the Ottoman Empire in 1868, partly in response to the experience of the Crimean War, in which disease overshadowed battle as the main cause of death and suffering among Turkish soldiers. It was the first Red Crescent society of its kind and one of the most important charity organizations in the Muslim world.

The society is a not-for-profit, volunteer-based social service institution providing unconditional aid and service, and is a corporate body governed by special legal provisions.

History 

The organization was founded under the Ottoman Empire on 11 June 1868 and was named "Hilâl-i Ahmer Cemiyeti" (Society of the Crimson Crescent), or in French the "Croissant-Rouge Ottomane" (Ottoman Red Crescent).

It later took on the names:
 "Ottoman Red Crescent Society" in 1877
 "Turkey’s Red Crescent Community" in 1923
 "Turkish Red Crescent Community" in 1935
 "Turkish Red Crescent Society" in 1947
It was renamed Kızılay by Mustafa Kemal Atatürk in 1935, after the foundation of the Republic of Turkey in 1923.

Beginning with the Russo-Turkish War (1877–78), the Turkish Red Crescent Society has provided medical relief to soldiers in all battlefields in which Turkey was present, through mobile and fixed hospitals, patient transportation services, hospital vessels, trained nurses and volunteers. It has provided humanitarian care regardless of nationality to all civilians affected by war. It has been involved in disaster relief and aid in natural disasters in Turkey. It has participated in international relief and response activities.

Examples of disaster relief activities include:
 2003 Bam earthquake
 2004 Indian Ocean earthquake and tsunami
 2005 Kashmir earthquake
 2006 Lebanon War
 Syrian Civil War
 2023 Turkey–Syria earthquake

Activities 

 Disaster management: Operations in 78 different countries in natural and human related disasters in the last 10 years
 Blood donations provided through 17 Regional Blood Centers, 65 Blood Donation Centers with more than 150 mobile blood donation vehicles Kinik, the head of the Turkish Red Crescent, said "Nearly 2.4 million people have donated blood to the Red Crescent in 2017, and there were 274,000 stem cell donations."
 International aid
 Health care: Hospitals in Konya, Kayseri and medical centers throughout Turkey
 First aid: 33 First aid centers throughout Turkey providing healthcare and first aid instruction. First aid training provided to a total of 100,000 people
 Immigration and Refugee Services: Assists the relevant public authorities in meeting the needs of refugees in Turkey, including shelter, health, and education. Runs 23 camps for the Refugees of the Syrian Civil War
 Youth & Educational Services: Projects aimed at youth to increase community awareness regarding disasters. Provides scholarships and runs youth camps
 Nuclear weapons: During and after the treaty on the prohibition of nuclear weapons the Turkish Red Crescent was an advocate, urging states to eliminate nuclear weapons
 Operations overseas: The Turkish Red Crescent now has permanent representatives in Somalia, Iraq, Palestine, Pakistan, Bangladesh, and Yemen in order to lend a helping hand to the vulnerable people of those war- torn countries.

Partnerships

Partnership with Qatar Charity 
The Turkish Red Crescent has recently begun to partner with Qatar Charity (QC) on various humanitarian projects.

In December 2016, the Turkish Red Crescent together with QC made a $10 million deal with the Turkish government to provide services for Syrian refugees in Turkey over the next five years. Kerem Kinik, head of the organization added "We have common areas of interest such as Palestine, Iraq and Somalia... this collaboration is just a beginning".

In June 2016, the organization and QC provided aid to victims of flooding and violence in Beledweyne, Somalia. Somalia has lost much of its rural areas to al-Shabaab, a terrorist organization with links to al-Qaeda that consistently carries out attacks throughout the country.

Partnership with Turkish government 
Following the 2016 Turkish coup d'état attempt, the Turkish Red Crescent backed the Turkish government, sending a letter to hundreds of international aid organizations and NGOs, including to organizations of the United Nations and Red Crescents in 191 total countries. Like the government, the Turkish Red Crescent blamed the Gülen movement (which the government of Turkey considers a terrorist organization) for the coup attempt.

Global Gathering 
In November 6–11, 2017, the International Red Cross and the Turkish Red Crescent movement brought together 190 national Red Cross and Red Crescent societies. Some major issues they discussed were: migration where they addressed prioritizing safety and assistance, nuclear weapons where they were working towards their elimination, and health where they addressed mental health and psycho social needs. Other issues included the need to involve affected people in relief and recovery efforts; the use of explosive weapons in popular areas; and the looming threat of epidemics and pandemics.

Gallery

See also
 International Red Cross and Red Crescent Movement

References

External links
Turkish Red Crescent official website 
 

Red Cross and Red Crescent national societies
Organizations established in 1868
Organizations based in Ankara
1868 establishments in the Ottoman Empire
Medical and health organizations based in Turkey
Emergency medical services in Turkey